Joel Banks (born 3 April 1975) is an English professional volleyball coach and former player. He currently serves as head coach for the Finland national team.

Honours

As a coach
 National championships
 2011/2012  Dutch SuperCup, with Langhenkel Volley
 2011/2012  Dutch Championship, with Langhenkel Volley
 2017/2018  Belgian Championship, with Greenyard Maaseik
 2018/2019  Belgian Championship, with Greenyard Maaseik

References

External links
 
 Coach profile at Volleybox.net

1975 births
Living people
Naturalised citizens of Belgium
Sportspeople from Portsmouth 
English men's volleyball players
English volleyball coaches
English expatriate sportspeople in Belgium
Expatriate volleyball players in Belgium
English expatriate sportspeople in Finland
English expatriate sportspeople in Poland
Skra Bełchatów coaches